Paul Elliott Singer (born August 22, 1944) is an American hedge fund manager, activist investor, philanthropist, and the founder, president and co-CEO of Elliott Management. As of October 2021, his net worth is estimated at US$4.3 billion.

Fortune magazine described Singer as one of the "smartest and toughest money managers" in the hedge fund industry.  A number of sources have branded him a "vulture capitalist", largely on account of his role at EMC, which has been called a vulture fund. The Independent has described him as "a pioneer in the business of buying up sovereign bonds on the cheap, and then going after countries for unpaid debts". 

Singer's Elliot Management has focused on activist campaigns, in which they take an equity stake in a company and agitate using influence and voting rights to encourage change, and they have also expanded into private equity.

Singer's philanthropic activities include financial support for LGBTQ rights. He has provided funding to the Manhattan Institute for Policy Research, is a strong opponent of raising taxes for the wealthiest 1% of taxpayers, such as himself, and opposes aspects of the Dodd-Frank Act. Singer is active in Republican Party politics, and he and others affiliated with Elliott Management are collectively "the top source of contributions" to the National Republican Senatorial Committee.

Early life
Singer was born in 1944, and grew up in Teaneck, New Jersey, in a Jewish family, one of three children of a Manhattan pharmacist and a homemaker. He obtained his B.S. in psychology from the University of Rochester in 1966 and a J.D. from Harvard Law School in 1969. In 1974 Singer went to work as an attorney in the real estate division of the investment bank Donaldson, Lufkin & Jenrette.

Career

Elliott Management

In 1977, with a convertible arbitrage "winning formula," Singer left law to create his own investment company. He founded the hedge fund Elliott Associates L.P. with US$1.3 million in seed capital from various friends and family members. According to The Telegraph in 2011, Elliott is "one of the oldest hedge funds on Wall Street." Singer is also the founder and CEO of NML Capital Limited, a Cayman Islands-based offshore unit of Elliott Management Corporation.

According to Fortune, Elliott has been involved "in most of the big post-crash restructurings." In 2009 The Guardian reported that Singer "through a brilliantly complex financial manoeuvre, took control of Delphi Automotive, the sole supplier of most of the auto parts needed by General Motors and  Chrysler." Ultimately, the US Treasury paid Elliott Management "$12.9 billion in cash and subsidies from the US Treasury's auto bailout fund." In December 2011 Elliott Associates sued Vietnam's state-owned shipbuilder Vinashin in the UK for defaulting the year before on a US$600 million syndicated loan.

In February 2014, Elliott controlled $23 billion (£19 billion) of funds and was the ninth largest investor on Wall Street.

In June 2015, Elliott was an active activist investor with Citrix Systems, pushing for various changes. In May 2014 the French Financial Markets Regulator fined Elliott a record €14 million ($22 million) for insider trading, a ruling which the company appealed. In a long-standing dispute between Singer and members of the Lee family over a merger between Samsung and Cheil Industries, in 2015 Samsung published numerous cartoons of Singer as an anthropomorphic vulture on its corporate website. The cartoons were denounced by Singer and others as antisemitic. Samsung responded several days later denouncing antisemitism, and pulled the images from their website.

Forbes rated Singer's net worth as $2.1 billion in 2015 and $2.2 billion in 2016. As of November 2015 Elliott Management Corporation oversees Elliott Associates and Elliott International Limited, which together have more than $27 billion in assets under management in a "multi-strategy fund." The corporation includes a private equity division. Termed a "specialist in activism in technology companies" by the Wall Street Journal in June 2015, Elliott Management's varied portfolio also includes a prominent tech component. The company pursued "more than 40 campaigns aimed at tech companies" between 2004 and 2015, according to Reuters. in 2018, Elliott Management took control of Italian football club A.C. Milan.

On February 1, 2020, several weeks before many Americans had heard of COVID-19, Singer wrote a memo to his employees about preparing for the possibility of being quarantined for at least a month due to the virus.

After Elliott Management took a stake in Twitter, Singer pushed to oust Jack Dorsey and control four seats on the board after Dorsey announced he would move to Africa. A deal was reached that gave Elliott Management a seat on the board and left Dorsey as CEO.

Sovereign debt
In the early 1990s, Singer began using the strategy of purchasing sovereign debt from nations in or near default, such as Argentina, and Peru, through his NML Capital Limited, and Republic of the Congo through Kensington International Inc. Singer's practice of purchasing distressed debt from companies and sovereign states and pursuing full payment through the courts has led to criticism. Singer and EMC defend their model as "a fight against charlatans who refuse to play by the market's rules", and supporters of the practice have said it "help[s] keep kleptocratic governments in check." In 1996 Elliott bought defaulted Peruvian debt for $11.4 million. Elliott won a $58 million judgment and Peru had to repay the sum in full under the pari passu rule. When former president of Peru Alberto Fujimori was attempting to flee the country due to human rights abuses and corruption, Singer confiscated his jet and offered to let him leave the country in exchange for the $58 million payment from the treasury. Fujimori accepted. In the 1990s the Kensington International division of EMC purchased US$30 million (£18m) of "Congolese sovereign debt... allegedly for less than $20m." Kensington subsequently spent years trying to be paid in full through the courts. In 2008 Kensington and the Republic of Congo settled for an undisclosed amount.

After Argentina defaulted on its debt in 2002, the Elliott-owned company NML Capital Limited refused to accept the Argentine offer to pay less than 30 cents per dollar of debt. Elliott sued Argentina for the debt's value, and the lower UK courts found that Argentina had state immunity. Elliott successfully appealed the case to the UK Supreme Court, which ruled that Elliott had the right to attempt to seize Argentine property in the United Kingdom, and on October 2, 2012, Singer arranged for a Ghanaian Court order to detain an Argentine naval vessel in a Ghanaian port in an effort to force Argentina to pay the debt, but was rebuffed when the seizure was barred by the International Tribunal for the Law of the Sea. In February 2013 the U.S. appeals court heard Argentina's appeal in the case of its default and debt to NML. In March 2013 Argentina offered a new plan, which was dismissed first by the lower courts and then the United States Court of Appeals for the Second Circuit on August 23, 2013, and then again in June 2014 in the U.S. Supreme Court. In March 2014 NML Capital unsuccessfully attempted to satisfy court awards by suing SpaceX, seeking the rights to two satellite-launch contracts bought by Argentina valued at $113 million. In early 2016 US courts ruled that Argentina must make full payments to holdout bondholders by February 29. In February 2016 Argentina reached an agreement with Singer.

Singer has been called a vulture capitalist because of Elliott Management Corporation's investments in distressed debt.

Business and investment model
According to Fortune, Singer focused from early times "on distressed assets," buying up bankrupt firms' debt and acquiring "a reputation for strong-arming his way to profit." Fortune noted in 2012 that losses sustained early in Singer's career led to a "risk aversion that still guides his investing today. Thanks to his caution, by 2012 Elliott had "only two down years" since 1977, rising "4.2% in 2011, a year in which most hedge funds lost money." Describing him as "one of the smartest and toughest money managers in the business", the article further notes that his firm "is so influential that fear of its tactics helped shape the current 2012 Greek debt restructuring."

Elliott was termed by The Independent as "a pioneer in the business of buying up sovereign bonds on the cheap, and then going after countries for unpaid debts." Singer describes his business model as "a fight against charlatans who refuse to play by the market's rules," and in 2013 Singer told Alpha Magazine that "we've made the point over and over again that sovereigns that could pay their debts and choose not to may be attempting to save some money but are harming their people and their economies by making investing in their countries more risky and more problematic and by discouraging foreign investment." In response, The Washington Post wrote in 2014 that "in Singer's view, he isn't just forcing indebted companies and countries to pay up. He's trying to create a world where distressed debt doesn't exist. Depending on your own views, that makes Singer an activist investor, or a 'vulture capitalist.'"

AC Milan
In July 2018, Singer became the owner of AC Milan after the soccer team's previous owner defaulted on a $37 million loan payment owed to Singer's hedge fund company. Elliott had loaned $400 million to the previous owner to help him purchase the team, which plays in Italy's top soccer league. Although the company had been expected to sell the club and entertained negotiations, Singer eventually stated that Elliott plans to return AC Milan "to the pantheon of top European football clubs where it rightly belongs" and to inject $66 million to "stabilize the club's finances" and "fund AC Milan's transformation."

Philanthropy
Singer signed The Giving Pledge, which signals a commitment by individuals to donate more than half of their wealth within their lifetime to address society's "most difficult moral and economic challenges."

Singer founded the Paul E. Singer Family Foundation, which supports charitable causes including the Harvard Graduate School of Education Singer Prize for Excellence in Secondary Teaching, VH1 Save The Music Foundation, the Food Bank For New York City, National Gay and Lesbian Task Force Action Fund, the American Unity Fund, the New York City Police Foundation, MarineParents.com, the Leukemia & Lymphoma Society and the Melanoma Research Alliance.

Singer and The Paul E. Singer Family Foundation are behind The Philos Project, a pro-Israel Christian organization. In 2016 Singer partnered with the Museum of the Bible to fund Passages Israel, a program to take college students to Israel. He is a "longtime supporter of hawkish pro-Israel causes" and a major funder of the conservative think tank Foundation for Defense of Democracies. In November 2018, after the Pittsburgh synagogue shooting, the Paul E. Singer Family Foundation announced it would donate $1 million to upgrade security at Jewish institutions in New York. The funds will be given to the United Jewish Appeal – Federation of New York, which will then distribute them as needed to individual synagogues, day schools, and community centers for safety reviews and enhanced precautions.

Singer also serves on the Board of Fellows of Harvard Medical School and the board of directors of Commentary Magazine.

Political activity
Singer is an active participant in Republican Party politics. He is a "self-proclaimed conservative libertarian". According to The New York Times, he supports "like-minded candidates who often share his distaste for what they view as governmental over-meddling in the financial industry." Singer has contributed more than $1 million to the political efforts of the Koch brothers. In 2014, Singer led a group of major Republican donors to form the American Opportunity Alliance, a group that brings together wealthy Republican donors who share Singer's support for LGBTQ rights, immigration reform and Israel. During the 2016 Presidential election campaign Singer supported Marco Rubio and donated a million dollars in March to the Our Principles PAC, a PAC attempting to derail Donald Trump's election campaign. He also started the American Unity PAC. He supported Trump's inaugural committee with $1 million together with 25 other billionaires.

Singer was a major contributor to George W. Bush's presidential campaigns. On March 14, 2008, Singer hosted a Republican National Committee luncheon in his home for 70 guests that raised $1.4 million for Bush. Bush appointed Singer to serve on the Honorary Delegation to accompany him to Jerusalem for the celebration of the 60th anniversary of the State of Israel in May 2008.

In 2007 Singer was one of Rudolph Giuliani's most important fundraisers in Giuliani's bid for the Republican presidential nomination. In 2007, Singer led a financial industry fund-raising effort for Giuliani, first as regional finance chair and later as senior policy adviser. Singer lent Giuliani his private jet. That same year, Singer at $175,000 was the sole contributor to a campaign to support a petition drive for a proposed California initiative to apportion the state's 55 electoral votes by congressional district. At least 19 of the state's 53 congressional districts were expected to vote for a GOP presidential candidate, enough to change the national results in a close election.

Singer was one of the largest donors of the 2010 midterm election cycle, contributing more than $4 million to support Republican candidates.

In 2011 Singer donated $1 million to Restore Our Future, a Super PAC created to support Mitt Romney in the 2012 U.S. presidential election. In 2013, Singer gave $100,000 to the Club for Growth, a 501(c)4 organization that supports Tea Party candidates. He has also donated millions of dollars to organizations that advocate for a strong military and for supporting Israel.

In 2012 Singer founded the nonprofit Start-up Nation Central, an NGO aimed at developing collaboration between Israel's tech sector and outside investors. Singer has invested around $20 million into Start-Up Nation Central, which is based in Tel Aviv.

Singer is a member of the Committee on Capital Markets Regulation, a non-governmental, nonpartisan research organization. He is chairman of the board of trustees for the Manhattan Institute for Policy Research, a conservative think tank in New York City, and on the board of directors of the Republican Jewish Coalition, a political lobbying group in the United States that promotes Jewish Republicans. He also served on the board of directors for the Jewish Institute for National Security Affairs.

In 2016 Singer invested $500,000 in a PAC supporting John Faso, a Congressional candidate in New York's 19th congressional district opposing progressive candidate and Wall Street critic Zephyr Teachout. Teachout responded to the donation by challenging Singer to come to the district and debate her. The same year, Singer supported Senator Marco Rubio in the presidential primary.

, Singer had not donated to Trump's reelection campaign.

LGBTQ rights
As well as contributing to private initiatives, Singer also actively seeks to persuade other Republicans to support gay marriage. He has joined other Wall Street executives in support of LGBT equality and stated that same-sex marriage promotes "family stability" and that in a time when "the institution of marriage in America has utterly collapsed," the fact that gay couples want to marry "is kind of a lovely thing and a cool thing and a wonderful thing."

Singer, whose son Andrew married his husband Corey Morris in a same-sex marriage in Massachusetts in 2009, has also financially supported the legalization of gay marriage in New York and Maryland. In 2011 this advocacy included supporting legislation allowing same-sex marriage in the state of New York.

In 2012 Singer provided $1 million to start a Political Action Committee named American Unity PAC. According to the New York Times, the PAC's "sole mission will be to encourage Republican candidates to support same-sex marriage, in part by helping them to feel financially shielded from any blowback from well-funded groups that oppose it." In 2014 Singer urged Republicans to pass the Employment Non-Discrimination Act. This bill requires workplace protections to extend to the LGBT community. As of June 2014 Singer had donated an estimated $10 million to the gay rights movement. Singer also funded the American Unity Fund.

In 2015 Singer, Tim Gill and Daniel Loeb helped fund Freedom For All Americans to promote LGBT issues in states and local communities in the United States.

The Washington Free Beacon

According to an October 27, 2017, article in The New York Times, the initial sponsor of anti-Trump opposition research conducted by the controversial Washington D.C. firm Fusion GPS was The Washington Free Beacon, a conservative political journalism website that is "funded in large part" by Singer.

Writings and commentary
Singer has written columns in the Wall Street Journal. In 2009 he wrote "Free-Marketeers Should Welcome Some Regulation," a column in which he argued that "It's true that monetary policy was too lax for too long, and the government encouraged lending to people who were unlikely to repay their loans. But this crisis was primarily caused by managements and individuals throughout the financial system who exercised extremely poor judgement. The private sector, not the public sector, is where the biggest mistakes were made." Among other topics, he has written against raising taxes for the wealthiest taxpayers ("the 1%") and aspects of the Dodd-Frank Act.

At a September 2006 financial conference in New York City, Singer delivered a speech called "Complexity Made Simple," advising that the purchase of collateralized debt obligations (CDOs) was a serious mistake, and anticipating the downturn of the housing market by nearly a year before the $770 billion taxpayer-funded bailout.

Hedge fund manager Jim Chanos said in an August 2009 radio interview that he and Singer had met with G7 finance ministers in 2007 to warn them that the global financial system was increasingly unstable and approaching a catastrophe, with banks on the verge of sinking the global economy. The pair argued that decisive action was called for, but Chanos claims they were met with indifference.

Personal life
In 2020 Singer ranked 222 on the Forbes 400 list of the richest Americans, 538 among the world's billionaires, and the 19th highest earning hedge fund manager. He has two sons, Andrew and Gordon.

After Andrew came out as gay, "[I reacted] with fear and nervousness, I worried about the health aspects ... grandfatherhood", Singer said. But he eventually became a steadfast supporter of gay rights. In 2012 he launched the American Unity PAC, which aims to persuade fellow conservatives to support same-sex marriage. He has actively supported same-sex marriage campaigns and makes large donations to LGBT groups.

Singer lives on New York City's Upper West Side and has a house in Aspen, Colorado. He began studying classical piano at the age of 10, and forms part of a family band, together with "one of his sons on guitar, the other on drums", and "his son-in-law on saxophone." He enjoys Led Zeppelin and has played onstage with Meat Loaf.

Honors 
In 2017, Singer received an honorary doctorate from the University of Rochester.

See also

 List of University of Rochester people
 List of Harvard Law School alumni
 List of libertarians in the United States
 50 Most Influential (Bloomberg Markets ranking)

References

Further reading

External links
 
 The Paul E. Singer Foundation

1944 births
Living people
21st-century philanthropists
Activists from New York (state)
American billionaires
American chief executives of financial services companies
American columnists
American financial commentators
American financiers
American hedge fund managers
American investors
American libertarians
American money managers
American political activists
American political fundraisers
American social activists
American venture capitalists
Businesspeople from New York City
Corporate raiders
Giving Pledgers
Harvard Law School alumni
Harvard Medical School people
Jewish activists
Jewish American attorneys
Jewish American philanthropists
Journalists from New York City
American LGBT rights activists
Manhattan Institute for Policy Research
New York (state) lawyers
New York (state) Republicans
People from the Upper West Side
People from Teaneck, New Jersey
People named in the Paradise Papers
Philanthropists from New York (state)
Shareholder-rights activists
University of Rochester alumni
21st-century American Jews